The Cape St. Elias Light is a lighthouse on Kayak Island in Alaska.

History
Congress approved the construction of a light station at Cape St. Elias in October 1913, appropriating $115,000 for the construction. construction began in 1915 and a third order Fresnel lens was installed. In 1927 the station was equipped with radio beacon facilities, which was the second such facility in Alaska. The light was automated by the United States Coast Guard in 1974. In 1998 a solar powered Vega optic was installed, replacing the original lens, which is in the Cordova Museum in Cordova, Alaska. Cape St. Elias Lighthouse was added to the National Register of Historic Places in 1975.  It is now being leased by the  Cape St. Elias Lightkeepers Association, a non-profit organization dedicated to preserving, restoring and sharing the lighthouse.

It began operations in 1916, which was the year that the Alaska Engineering Commission started building the Alaska Railroad "which eventually established Southcentral Alaska as the economic hub of all Alaska".  This lighthouse "proved to be an indispensable navigational aid along the shipping lanes from the contiguous American states and Southeastern Alaska to Cordova, Valdez, Seward, and Anchorage."  Those ports could be notified of ships arriving, by station keeper radio that also was installed in 1916.

Climate

See also

 List of lighthouses in the United States
National Register of Historic Places listings in Chugach Census Area, Alaska

References

External links
 Lighthouse Friends — Cape St. Elias Lighthouse
 
 Picture of Cape St. Elias Light

1916 establishments in Alaska
Buildings and structures on the National Register of Historic Places in Chugach Census Area, Alaska
Lighthouses completed in 1916
Lighthouses in Unorganized Borough, Alaska
Lighthouses on the National Register of Historic Places in Alaska